The Army of the Frontier was a Union army that served in the Trans-Mississippi Theater during the Civil War.  It fought in several minor engagements in Arkansas, Indian Territory, and Kansas.  In June 1863 the Army was discontinued but many of its regiments were formed into the District of the Frontier.

History

The army was created on October 12, 1862, composed of forces from the District of Southwest Missouri.  General John M. Schofield was the army's first commander.  Prior to this (from October 1–12, 1862) Schofield's field army was known as the Army of Southwestern Missouri.  The Army of the Frontier consisted of three divisions at its largest.  They were commanded respectively by James G. Blunt, James Totten, and Francis J. Herron.

Units of the army (mostly Blunt's 1st Division) engaged in several small battles early in the war.  The Battle of Prairie Grove in 1862 was the army's finest moment of the war.  During the campaign General Schofield was in St. Louis due to illness, and General Blunt assumed temporary command of the army.  Colonel Daniel Huston, Jr. temporarily replaced Totten in command of the 2nd Division.  Both the 2nd and 3rd Divisions were then placed under the overall command of General Herron.

Herron replaced Schofield as commander in March 1863.  In May of that year the army's 2nd Division under William Vandever fought the Battle of Chalk Bluff against a Confederate raid under John S. Marmaduke.  The army as a whole was dissolved on June 5, 1863, yet remnants were formed into "Herron's Division" and sent as reinforcements to the Siege of Vicksburg.

Commanders

 General John M. Schofield  (October 12, 1862 – November 20, 1862)
 General James G. Blunt  (November 20, 1862 – December 29, 1862)
 General John M. Schofield (December 29, 1862 – March 30, 1863)
 General Francis J. Herron  (March 30, 1863-5 June 1863)

Major Battles

 Battle of Old Fort Wayne (Schofield) only Blunt's 1st Division was involved
 Battle of Prairie Grove (Blunt, field command)
 Battle of Chalk Bluff (Herron) only Vandever's 2nd Division was involved
 Siege of Vicksburg  (Herron) as "Herron's Division, XIII Corps"

District of the Frontier
On June 6 the remaining units in Arkansas and the Indian Territory, formerly belonging to the Army of the Frontier, were organized into the District of the Frontier with General Blunt in command. The district was part of the Department of the Missouri and was composed of the Indian Territory, western Arkansas, southwestern Missouri and southern Kansas.

With troops from this district Blunt fought and won the Battle of Honey Springs in 1863, but suffered a defeat at Baxter Springs later that year.  Blunt was relieved of command in January 1864.  At the same time the District of the Frontier divided up.  The Indian Territory and Fort Smith, Arkansas, were designated the District of the Frontier in the Department of Kansas and placed under the command of Colonel William R. Judson.  The areas in Arkansas were designated the District of the Frontier in the Department of Arkansas and placed under the command of General John Milton Thayer.  Thayer's troops were attached to the VII Corps during the Camden Expedition as the "Frontier Division".

On February 23, 1864, Blunt replaced Judson in command of the District of the Frontier, Department of Kansas.  Blunt commanded until April 17 when his district was discontinued.  Fort Smith was transferred to Thayer's district and the rest of the Indian Territory was divided among other districts.  Thayer's District of the Frontier continued until February 1, 1865, when it too was discontinued.

Commanders
 General James G. Blunt (June 9, 1863 – January 6, 1864) part of the Dept. of Missouri
 Colonel William R. Judson (January 6, 1864 – February 23, 1864) part of the Dept. of Kansas
 General James G. Blunt (February 23, 1864-17 April 1864) part of the Dept. of Kansas
 General John Thayer (January 6, 1864-February 1865) part of the Dept. of Arkansas

Major Battles
 Battle of Honey Springs (Blunt's district)
 Camden Expedition (Thayer's district)

References

See also
William Sloan Tough
Army on the Frontier

Frontier, Battle of the
Arkansas in the American Civil War
Indian Territory in the American Civil War
Kansas in the American Civil War
1862 establishments in the United States
Military units and formations established in 1862
Military units and formations disestablished in 1863